Dušan Korać may refer to:

Dušan Korać (Yugoslav People's Army), military figure
Dušan Korać (politician)